The IFA F9, subsequently rebadged as the EMW 309, is a compact saloon manufactured under the auspices of the Russian and East German states between 1949 or 1950 and 1956. It was initially built at Zwickau at the plant previously owned by Auto Union. In 1953 production was transferred to the EMW, former BMW manufacturing plant at Eisenach under the name EMW 309 until 1956 where its underpinnings subsequently found their way into the Wartburg 311.

Origins
Mechanically the F9 derived from the DKW F8 which had been available between 1939 and 1942. The body closely followed the design of the DKW F9, a prototype with which Auto Union would have replaced the F8 on the Zwickau production lines earlier, had the war not intervened. After the war, the first car assembled at Zwickau was the prewar DKW F8, but the more modern F9 started to appear in 1949 or 1950 (sources differ). Materials shortages probably delayed introduction in both German states, but the eastern car beat the western to the market, and certainly featured the three-cylinder motor from the 1938 F9 prototype (rather than the two-cylinder motor that had been in serial production in 1942) at least three years before Auto Union in Düsseldorf were installing it in their F91. The Western group, however, had access to the original F9 body tooling which had been ordered before the war and had been produced but neither delivered to Zwickau nor scrapped, instead remaining at supplier Allgaier's facility in Uhingen, Baden-Wuerttemberg.

The bodies
Surviving F9s appear  largely restricted to saloon versions, but various sports and cabriolet versions were also produced. Steel for consumer industries was in short supply across many parts of Europe during this period, and the F9’s body construction increasingly involved plastic panels, especially after production was moved to Eisenach in 1953. The car was accordingly usefully lighter than its western built Auto Union equivalent.

Technical
The engine was water-cooled, the radiator being located behind the engine, an unusual configuration but one also found on the DKW F91. The front wheels were driven via a four-speed manual gear box with a free wheel.

References

IFA vehicles
Compact cars
Front-wheel-drive vehicles
1950s cars
Cars introduced in 1949